WPPR (88.3) is a public radio station in Demorest, Georgia.  Originally, WPPR had the call letters WDEM (Radio Demorest), but changed to WPPR on August 19, 1996. It is part of the Georgia Public Broadcasting radio network, which in turn is a member of National Public Radio, Public Radio International, and American Public Media. Unlike many stations of the GPB network, WPPR does not only broadcast simulcasts from GPB. WPPR also produces its own programming about the local area including Habersham County. One of the community features, Community Life in Northeast Georgia, is an educational and informative program about an area that is not well known. WPPR's studios are located on the Piedmont College campus in Demorest. This allows for Piedmont Mass Communications students to work directly with WPPR as interns.

See also

 List of radio stations in Georgia (U.S. state)
 Piedmont College

References

External links
Georgia Public Broadcasting
Piedmont College

PPR
WPPR
Habersham County, Georgia